Darusentan (LU-135252; HMR-4005) is an endothelin receptor antagonist. Gilead Colorado, a subsidiary of Gilead Sciences, under license from Abbott Laboratories, is developing darusentan for the potential treatment of uncontrolled hypertension.

In June 2003, Myogen licensed the compound from Abbott for its application in the cancer field.

In May 2007, a randomized, double-blind, active control, parallel assignment, safety and efficacy phase III trial was initiated in subjects who had completed the maintenance period of the DAR-312 study, but was terminated because the study did not reach its primary endpoints.

See also
 Ambrisentan

References

Endothelin receptor antagonists
Barbiturates
Experimental drugs
Lactims
Carboxylic acids
Diphenylmethanol ethers
Aromatic ethers